De grønne pigespejdere (The Green Girl Guides) is the only Guiding and Scouting organisation in Denmark exclusively for girls. It was established in 1919 as the KFUK-spejderne i Danmark (YWCA-Guides in Denmark) and changed its name to De grønne pigespejdere in 2003. De grønne pigespejdere is member of the World Association of Girl Guides and Girl Scouts through Pigespejdernes Fællesråd Danmark.

The uniform is a green shirt with a chequered scarf.

See also

 Scouting and Guiding in Denmark

External links
 Official homepage

World Association of Girl Guides and Girl Scouts member organizations
Scouting and Guiding in Denmark
Youth organizations established in 1919